Stefan or Stephan is a masculine given name, a form of the English name Stephen.

People

Medieval period
Ordered chronologically
 Stefan Vojislav (died 1043), Serbian Byzantine governor and Prince of Duklja
 Stefan (archbishop of Uppsala), Sweden, (before 1150–1185), first archbishop from 1164 to 1185
 Stefan Nemanja or Stefan I, Nemanja (c. 1109–1199), grand prince of the Serb state of Raška
 Stefan Nemanjić or Stefan II, Nemanja (1176–1228), proclaimed King of Serbia in 1217
 Stefan Radoslav of Serbia (c. 1192 – c. 1235), King of Serbia, son of Nemanjić
 Stefan Vladislav I of Serbia (died after 1264), son of Stefan Nemanjić
 Stefan Dragutin (died 1316), King of Serbia, son of Stefan Uroš I
 Stefan Uroš II Milutin of Serbia (1282–1321)
 Stefan Vladislav II of Syrmia (1321 – c. 1325)
 Stefan Uroš III Dečanski of Serbia (1321–1331)
 Stefan Uroš IV Dušan of Serbia (Dušan the Mighty) (1331–1355), king 1331–1346; tsar 1346–1355
 Stefan Uroš V of Serbia (Uroš the Weak) (1355–1371), tsar
 Stefan Lazarević (c. 1377–1427), Serbian despot
 Stefan Lochner (c. 1410–1451), German painter
 Stefan Branković (c. 1417–1476), Serbian despot
 Stefan I Crnojević (1426–1465), Lord of Zeta (Montenegro) 1451–1465
 Stefan II Crnojević, lord of Zeta (Montenegro) 1496–1499

Modern era

A–F
 Stefan Airapetjan (born 1997), Estonian singer and Eurovision 2022 competitor
 Stefan Andersson (born 1967), Swedish singer-songwriter
 Stefan Andres (1906–1970), German novelist
 Stefan Banach (1892–1945), Polish mathematician 
 Stefan Baretzki (1919–1988), Romanian-German concentration camp guard
 Stefan Bellof (1957–1985), German racing driver
 Stefan Birčević (born 1989), Serbian basketball player
 Stefan Bogoridi (1775–1859), Ottoman statesman of Bulgarian origin
 Stefan Bradl (born 1989), German motorcycle racer
 Stefan Brink (born 1952), Swedish philologist
 Stefan Brzózka (1931–2023), Polish chess player
 Stefan Burnett (born 1978), American musician, rapper and visual artist
 Stefan Charles (born 1988), American football player
 Stefan Czarniecki (1599–1665), Polish nobleman, general and military commander
 Stefan Dembiński (1887–1972), Polish general
 Stefan Dennis (born 1958), Australian actor 
 Stefan Dohr (born 1965), German horn player
 Stefan Edberg (born 1966), Swedish tennis player
 Stefan Effenberg (born 1968), German footballer
 Stefan Everts (born 1972), Belgian motocross racer
 Stefan Fatsis (born 1963), American author and journalist
 Stefan Florescu (1926/1927–2010), American paralympic swimmer and table tennis player
 Stefan Frenkel (1902–1979), American violinist

G–M
 Stefan George (1868–1933), German poet, editor, and translator
 Stefan Gieren, German film producer and writer
 Stefan Golaszewski, British-Polish writer, performer, and director
 Stefan Grimm (1963–2014), German biologist and professor
 Stefan Groothuis (born 1981), Dutch speed skater
 Stefan Heinig (born 1962), German business executive
 Stefan Hell (born 1962), Romanian-born German physicist
 Stefan Holm (born 1976), Swedish high jumper
 Stefan Holt (born 1986/1987), American journalist and TV news anchor
 Stefan Humphries (born 1962), American former football player
 Stefan Ilsanker (luger) (born 1965), West German luger
 Stefan Ilsanker (footballer) (born 1989), Austrian footballer
 Stefan Jędrychowski (1910–1996), Polish politician
 Stefan de Leval Jezierski (born 1954), American horn player
 Stefan Johansen (born 1991), Norwegian footballer
 Stefan Jović (born 1990), Serbian basketball player
 Stefan Kalipha (born 1940), British actor originally from Trinidad
 Stefan Keller (born 1961), Swiss flute player 
 Stefan Kießling (born 1984), German footballer
 Stefan Kramer (born 1982), Chilean impressionist
 Stefan Koubek (born 1977), Austrian tennis player
 Stefan Kraft (born 1993), Austrian ski jumper
 Stefan Küng (born 1993), Swiss cyclist 
 Stefan Koch (born 1964), German basketball coach
 Stefan Kuntz (born 1962), German footballer
 Stefan Lamanna (born 1995), Canadian soccer player
 Stefan Langerman, Belgian mathematician and computer scientist
 Stefan Lindemann (born 1980), German figure skater
 Stefan Liv (1980–2011), Polish-born Swedish ice hockey goaltender
 Stefan Łodwigowski (1815–1895), Polish composer
 Stefan Löfven (born 1957), Swedish politician
 Stefan Lövgren (born 1970), Swedish handball player
 Stefan Lulchev (1971–2017), Bulgarian footballer 
 Stefan Lux (1888–1936), Slovak journalist 
 Stefan Maierhofer (born 1982), Austrian footballer
 Stefan Majewski (born 1956), Polish footballer
 Stefan Mappus (born 1966), German politician
 Stefan Marković (born 1988), Serbian basketball player
 Stefan Matz, German head chef
 Stefan Mitrović (born 1988), Serbian water polo player

N–Z
 Stefan Nimke (born 1978), German track cyclist
 Stefan Noesen (born 1993), American ice hockey player
 Stefan Nutz (born 1992) Austrian football player
 Stefan Nystrand (born 1981), Swedish swimmer
 Stefan Olsdal (born 1974), Swedish rock guitarist
 Stefan Peno (born 1997), Serbian basketball player
 Stefan Persson (born 1947), Swedish business magnate
 Stefan Pettersson (born 1963), Swedish footballer
 Stefan Petzner (born 1981), Austrian BZÖ politician
 Stefan Raab (born 1966), German entertainer, comedian, musician and TV host
 Stefan Ravaničanin (c. 1670–after 1733), Serbian monk and chronicler
 Stefan Rehn (born 1966), Swedish football player and manager
 Stefan Reinartz (born 1989), German footballer
 Stefan Reuter (born 1966), German football player and manager
 Stefan Rowecki (1895–1944), Polish general, journalist and leader of the resistance during World War II
 Stefan Ruzowitzky (born 1961), Austrian film director and screenwriter
 Stefan Rzadzinski (born 1993), Canadian racing driver
 Stefan Sandborg (born 1970), Swedish Army major general
 Stefan Savić (born 1991), Montenegrin footballer
 Stefan Schörghuber (1961–2008), German businessman
 Stefan Schwarz (born 1969), Swedish football player and manager
 Stefan Schumacher (born 1981), German road racing cyclist
 Stefan Skarbek, British songwriter, producer, multi-instrumentalist and singer
 Stefan Sofiyanski (born 1951), Bulgarian politician
 Stefan Soltész (1949–2022), Hungarian-born Austrian conductor
 Stefan Soroka (born 1951), Canadian archbishop
 Stefan Stambolov (1854–1895), Bulgarian journalist, revolutionist, poet
 Stefan Strandberg (born 1990), Norwegian footballer
 Stefan Torssell (born 1946), Swedish sea captain, author, lecturer and reporter 
 Stefan Toshev (1859–1924), Bulgarian General during World War I
 Stefan de Vrij (born 1992), Dutch footballer
 Stefan Wallin (born 1967), Swedish-Finnish politician
 Stefan Wilmont - Polish criminal who assassinated the mayor of Gdańsk
 Stefan William (born 1993), Indonesian actor on SCTV
 Stefan Wisniewski (born 1953), German extremist convicted criminal
 Stefan Wul (1922–2003), pseudonym of Pierre Pairault, French science fiction writer
 Stefan Wyszyński (1901–1981), Polish prelate of the Roman Catholic Church
 Stefan Żeromski (1864–1925), Polish novelist and dramatist
 Stefan Zweig (1881–1942), Austrian novelist, playwright, journalist and biographer

Fictional characters
 King Stefan, father of Princess Aurora in the 1959 Disney animated film Sleeping Beauty
Stefan DiMera, in the soap opera Days of Our Lives
Stefan Salvatore, in The Vampire Diaries novel and TV series
Stefan Urquelle the alter ego of Steve Urkel from the show Family Matters

See also 
 Stefan (surname), a surname
 Stefa, a female given name
 Stefaan, a masculine given name
 Stefen, a masculine given name
 Stephan (given name), a masculine given name

Breton masculine given names
Bulgarian masculine given names
Danish masculine given names
Dutch masculine given names
English masculine given names
German masculine given names
Lists of people by given name
Masculine given names
Polish masculine given names
Serbian masculine given names
Swedish masculine given names